Neil James Lumsden (born December 19, 1952) is a Canadian politician and retired professional football player. Lumsden was elected to the Legislative Assembly of Ontario in the 2022 provincial election, and was subsequently appointed as the Minister of Tourism, Culture and Sport in June 2022.

Lumsden played his entire professional career in the Canadian Football League, mostly as a fullback and also as a running back for the Toronto Argonauts, Hamilton Tiger-Cats and Edmonton Eskimos from 1976 to 1985.

Early life

He played high school football at Northern Secondary School and graduated from Crescent School in Toronto.

Football career

Some of his career highlights include the Vanier Cup with the University of Ottawa Gee-Gees in 1975, being the eastern conference nominee for Most Outstanding Rookie in 1976, losing out to John Sciarra of the BC Lions, and winning three Grey Cup Championships with Edmonton Eskimos from 1980 to 1982, and again being a Grey Cup winner in 1999 as General Manager of the Hamilton Tiger-Cats. In the 1981 Grey Cup game Lumsden with 8 receptions for 91 yards plus a carry for 2 yards was selected as the Outstanding Canadian being awarded with the Dick Suderman Trophy.

In ten seasons Lumsden played in 141 regular season games and carried the ball 767 times for 3755 yards and with 36 touchdowns. He also had 180 receptions for 1729 yards and 15 more touchdowns. Several times during his career he was called on to fill in as a placekicker and punter.

Post-CFL career

Lumsden worked briefly in cycling when he was appointed COO of the Hamilton, Ontario, UCI Road World Championships in 2003. This was only the fourth time the road cycling world championships had taken place outside Europe.

Lumsden now heads Drive Marketing, a sports marketing firm and a division of OK&D Marketing Group of Burlington, Ontario.

Lumsden acted as Honorary Chairman of the 2008 Desjardins Vanier Cup in Hamilton, Ontario.

In 2014, he was inducted into the Canadian Football Hall of Fame.

Political career 
In 2022, he was nominated to run as a candidate for the Progressive Conservative Party of Ontario in the provincial electoral riding of Hamilton East—Stoney Creek. He was then elected to the Legislative Assembly of Ontario in the 2022 provincial election.

Personal life

His son is Jesse Lumsden was also a CFL football player who played for the Hamilton Tiger-Cats, Edmonton Eskimos, and Calgary Stampeders before retiring in 2011. He is now a member of the Canadian Olympic Bobsled Team.

In 2015, he and his daughter, Kristin Lumsden, a makeup artist/skincare specialist living and working in Toronto, competed in the third season of The Amazing Race Canada. In the first six legs, they placed 10th, 6th, 1st, 6th, 7th, and 6th. In the seventh leg, they placed last in 7th place and were eliminated from the show.

References

1952 births
Living people
Canadian football fullbacks
Canadian Football Hall of Fame inductees
Canadian Football League announcers
Canadian Football League Rookie of the Year Award winners
Canadian football running backs
Canadian television sportscasters
Edmonton Elks players
Hamilton Tiger-Cats general managers
Hamilton Tiger-Cats players
Ottawa Gee-Gees football players
Politicians from Hamilton, Ontario
Politicians from London, Ontario
Sportspeople from Hamilton, Ontario
Sportspeople from London, Ontario
Toronto Argonauts players
The Amazing Race Canada contestants
University of Ottawa alumni
Progressive Conservative Party of Ontario MPPs
Canadian sportsperson-politicians